So Fresh: The Hits of Autumn 2002 is a compilation of songs that were popular in Australia in summer 2002. The album was released on 25 March 2002.

Track listing
 Sophie Ellis-Bextor – "Murder on the Dancefloor" (3:47)
 112 – "Dance with Me" (3:58)
 Shakaya – "Stop Calling Me" (3:37)
 Ja Rule featuring Case – "Livin' It Up" (4:18)
 Nickelback – "How You Remind Me" (3:43)
 Alcazar – "Crying at the Discoteque" (3:51)
 Jennifer Lopez – "I'm Real" (3:15)
 Alicia Keys – "Fallin'" (3:30)
 St. Lunatics featuring Nelly – "Batter Up" (4:12)
 Blu Cantrell – "Hit 'Em Up Style (Oops!)" (4:10)
 Mary J. Blige – "Family Affair" (4:00)
 Jagged Edge featuring Nelly – "Where the Party At" (3:54)
 Natalie Imbruglia – "That Day" (4:42)
 Nikki Webster – "The Best Days" (3:23)
 Christina Milian – "AM to PM" (3:51)
 Killing Heidi – "Heavensent" (4:30)
 Jamiroquai – "You Give Me Something" (3:18)
 Anastacia – "Paid My Dues" (3:20)
 Tina Arena – "Dare You to Be Happy" (4:11)
 Kosheen – "Hide U" (John Creamer & Stephane K Remix Edit) (4:13)

Charts

References

So Fresh albums
2002 compilation albums
2001 in Australian music